Benjamin Longiros (born 3 March 1963) is a Ugandan long-distance runner. He competed in the men's marathon at the 1988 Summer Olympics.

References

1963 births
Living people
Athletes (track and field) at the 1988 Summer Olympics
Ugandan male long-distance runners
Ugandan male marathon runners
Olympic athletes of Uganda
Place of birth missing (living people)